This is a list of faculties of law in France by region.

Auvergne-Rhône-Alpes 

 Faculty of Law, University of Savoy, Chambéry Jacob-Bellecombette campus
 University of Clermont Auvergne, Legal Science and Politics, Clermont-Ferrand
 Pierre Mendès-France University, Grenoble, U.F.R., Faculty of Law
 Jean Moulin University Lyon 3, Faculty of Law, Lyon
 Université Catholique de Lyon - Faculté de Droit
 University Lumière Lyon, Faculty of Juridical Sciences, University Campus of Bron-Parilly
 Jean Monnet University, St-Etienne, Faculty of Law and Economics and Management

Bourgogne-Franche-Comté 

 University of Franche-Comté (Besançon), Faculty of Law and Economics and Political Science
 University of Dijon, Faculty of Law and Political Science

Brittany 

 University of Rennes I, Faculty of Law and Political Sciences
 Faculty of Law and Economic Sciences, University of Western Brittany, Brest
 Université de Bretagne-Sud - Droit, Économie et Gestion, Lorient

Centre-Val de Loire 

University of Orléans, Faculty of Law and Economic Sciences
University of Tours, Faculty of Law, Economy, Management, and Commerce

Grand Est 

 Paul Verlaine University - Metz U.E.R., Juridical, Economic, and Social Sciences, Metz
Université de Haute-Alsace - Faculté des Sciences Économiques, Sociales et Juridiques, Mulhouse
University of Nancy, U.E.R. Faculty of Law and Economic Sciences
University of Reims Champagne-Ardenne, U.E.R. Faculty of Law and Sciences, Reims
University of Strasbourg, Faculty of Management, Law, and Political Sciences

Guadeloupe 

 Université des Antilles et de la Guyane - Faculty of Law and Economics, Pointe-à-Pitre

Hauts-de-France 

 Université Lille 2 Droit et Santé, Lille
 University of Picardie, U.E.R. of Law and Political and Social Sciences, Amiens
 Université du Littoral Côte d'Opale - Droit, Dunkerque
 Université Catholique de Lille - Faculté Libre de Droit
 Université de Valenciennes et Hainaut-Cambrésis - Faculté de Droit, d'Economie et de Gestion, Valenciennes

Île-de-France 

Panthéon-Sorbonne University, Paris
Panthéon-Assas University, Paris
CY Cergy Paris University, Department of Law, Cergy
Université de Versailles Saint-Quentin-en-Yvelines - Faculté de Droit et de Science Politique, Guyancourt
University of Paris - Faculté de Droit, Malakoff
Université d'Évry Val d'Essonne - Sciences Économiques et Juridiques, Évry, Essonne
Université Paris-Dauphine - Faculté de Droit, Paris
University of Paris 8 Vincennes-Saint-Denis - Département de Droit, Saint-Denis
Paris-Saclay University, Faculty of Law and Economic Sciences (Sceaux and Orsay)
Paris-Nanterre University, U.E.R. of Juridical, Administrative, and Political Sciences
Paris Est Créteil University, Faculty of Law and Economic Sciences, Créteil
Paris 13 University, Law and Political Sciences, Villetaneuse

Martinique 

 Université des Antilles et de la Guyane - Faculty of Law and Economics, Schœlcher

Normandy 

Faculty of Law and Political Science, University of Caen, Caen
University of Le Havre, Faculty of International Affairs, Law department
University of Rouen, Faculty of Law and Economic Sciences

Nouvelle-Aquitaine 

 Faculty of Law and Political Sciences, Montesquieu University, Bordeaux
 Université de la Rochelle - Faculté de Droit, Science Politique et de Gestion, La Rochelle
 University of Limoges, Faculty of Law and Economic Sciences
 University of Pau and the Adour region, UFR of Law, Economy, and Management (name written at the entrance : Faculty of Law and Economic Sciences), Pau, Pyrénées-Atlantiques
 University of Poitiers, UFR Law and Social Sciences

Occitanie 

 University of Montpellier, Faculty of Law and Economic Sciences
 Department of Law and Economics, University of Perpignan Via Domitia, Perpignan
 University of Toulouse I, University of Social Sciences

Pays de la Loire 

 Faculty of Law and Economic Sciences, University of Angers, Angers
 Institut catholique d'études supérieures - Faculté de Droit, La Roche sur Yon
 Faculty of Law and Economic Sciences, University of Maine, Le Mans
University of Nantes, UFR Law and Political Sciences, Chemin de la Censive du Tertre

Provence-Alpes-Côte d'Azur 

Faculty of Law and Political Science, Aix-Marseille University (Aix-en-Provence, Marseille and Arles)
Department of Legal Sciences and Economic Policy, University of Avignon and Vaucluse, Avignon
Faculty of Law, University of the South, Toulon
University of Nice, UFR Juridical, Political, Economic, and Management Sciences
Université Pascal Paoli - Droit, Sciences Sociales, Economiques et de Gestion, Corsica

Réunion 

Université de la Réunion - Faculté de Droit et d'Economie, Saint-Denis Messag

UFR = Education and Research Unit (unité de formation et de recherche)
U.E.R. = Teaching and Research Unit (Unité d'enseignement et de recherche)

References

Education in France

France
Law schools
Law